List of notable bands from Lincoln, Nebraska.

Brimstone Howl
Casting Pearls
For Against
Lullaby for the Working Class
Matthew Sweet
Neva Dinova
Zager and Evans
Eagle*Seagull
Josh Hoyer and Soul Colossal

Lincoln, Nebraska
Lincoln
Bands
Lists of bands